Palli Sanchay Bank, Rural Savings Bank, is a state owned bank in Bangladesh. Md. Akram-Al-Hossain is the chairman of the bank. Khondoker Ataur Rahman is the managing director of the bank.

History
On 2 July 2014, the Government of Bangladesh passed the Palli Sanchay Act 2014 to form the Palli Sanchay Bank. The bank was modeled after Grameen Bank, which was founded by Muhammad Yunus. According to the act, the government of Bangladesh would own 51 percent of the shares and members of Ektee Bari Ektee Khamar project (One House, One Farm project) would own rest of the shares. The bank would start with 10 billion taka authorised capital and 2 billion taka paid-up capital. The proposal for the bank was opposed by Bangladesh Bank and Bank and Financial Institutions Division of the Ministry of Finance. They recommended that instead of a bank, a financial institute be created. They believed that bank would fail to do its purpose like other specialised banks. The move to create the bank was initially opposed by the Ministry of Finance. The government promised to match deposits after two years. The bank started operating on 1 July 2021 after Ektee Bari Ektee Khamar project closed on 30 June 2021. There are more than 120 thousand rural cooperatives societies linked to the bank.

In 2018, the Palli Sanchay Bank announced plans to open branches in 462 Upazila (sub-district) of Bangladesh, having opened branches in 406 Upazilas by February 2018. In 2020, the bank introduced Grain Stock Loan to provide finance to farmers facing difficulty in selling their produce during the COVID-19 pandemic in Bangladesh. The loans considers grain stock as collateral.

In January 2019, the Palli Sanchay Bank branch manager of Sunamganj District, Tanjil Ahmed, was arrested for assaulting a traffic police officer.

Palli Sanchay Bank had 34.45 billion taka in 2021 which was a decrease of 2.74 billion taka from 37.19 billion taka in 2020. It has deposited 3.04 billion taka with the Bangladesh Commerce Bank Limited. An audit by Bangladesh Bank found evidence of loan forgery and embezzlement. On 14 September, Khondokar Ataur Rahman was appointed managing director of Palli Sanchay Bank.

Board of directors

References

Banks of Bangladesh
Banks established in 2014
2014 establishments in Bangladesh